Jiménez is one of the 67 municipalities of Chihuahua, in northern Mexico. The municipal seat lies at José Mariano Jiménez. The municipality covers an area of 11,074.14 km².

As of 2010, the municipality had a total population of 41,265, up from 40,467 as of 2005. 

The municipality had 498 localities, the largest of which (with 2010 populations in parentheses) was: José Mariano Jiménez (34,281), classified as urban.

Geography

Towns and villages
The municipality has 243 localities. The largest are:

References

Municipalities of Chihuahua (state)
Populated places established in 1824